Stefan Edberg defeated Jim Courier in the final, 6–2, 6–4, 6–0 to win the men's singles tennis title at the 1991 US Open.

Pete Sampras was the defending champion, but lost in the quarterfinals to Courier.

Five-time champion Jimmy Connors, who turned 39 during the tournament, entered as a wildcard and reached the semifinals before losing to Courier. Connors became the oldest male semifinalist in the major since Ken Rosewall at the 1974 US Open.

Seeds
The seeded players are listed below. Stefan Edberg was the champion; others show the round in which they were eliminated.

  Boris Becker (third round)
  Stefan Edberg (champion)
  Michael Stich (quarterfinalist)
  Jim Courier (finalist)
  Ivan Lendl (semifinalist)
  Pete Sampras (quarterfinalist)
  Guy Forget (second round)
  Andre Agassi (first round)
  Sergi Bruguera (second round)
  Karel Nováček (third round)
  David Wheaton (fourth round)
  Goran Ivanišević (fourth round)
  Andrei Cherkasov (first round)
  Emilio Sánchez (fourth round)
  Petr Korda (first round)
  John McEnroe (third round)

Draw

Key
 Q = Qualifier
 WC = Wild card
 r = Retired

Final eight

Section 1

Section 2

Section 3

Section 4

Section 5

Section 6

Section 7

Section 8

External links
 Association of Tennis Professionals (ATP) – 1991 US Open Men's Singles draw
1991 US Open – Men's draws and results at the International Tennis Federation

Men's singles
US Open (tennis) by year – Men's singles